South Korea competed at the 1998 Winter Paralympics in Nagano, Japan. 4 competitors from South Korea won no medals and so did not place in the medal table.

See also 
 South Korea at the Paralympics
 South Korea at the 1998 Winter Olympics

References 

South Korea at the Paralympics
1998 in South Korean sport
Nations at the 1998 Winter Paralympics